Joe Ellis-Brown (15 June 1916 – 21 November 1967) was a South African sailor. He competed in the 5.5 Metre event at the 1952 Summer Olympics.

References

External links
 

1916 births
1967 deaths
South African male sailors (sport)
Olympic sailors of South Africa
Sailors at the 1952 Summer Olympics – 5.5 Metre
Sportspeople from Durban